Elakurichi is  a small village in Ariyalur district, Tamil Nadu, South India,  and a Catholic pilgrimage center dedicated to Virgin Mary.  It is 20km from Thanjavur.  The ancient church was built by the famous Catholic Missionary Constanzo Beschi popularly known as ‘Veeramamunivar’ in the year 1711.

Elakurichi previously called Tirukavalur  is located near Ariyalur. Elakurichi is 25 km from ariyalur. Elakurichi holds a famous Catholic shrine called Adaikalamadha shrine. Veeramamunivar had constructed the Aadaikalamatha Church in Elakurichi.  Every year the Elakurichi Adaikalamadha shrine car festival is  famous. Christians  come together to celebrate the festival every year in April.

During this festival pilgrims gather to pray to Mother Mary popularly known as Adaikalamadha from throughout Tamil Nadu, especially pilgrims come by bullock carts from nearby parishes such as Varadarajan Pet, Tennur, Keelaneduvai and Koovathur.

The Village is located in the River bank of Kollidam, the main occupation of the people of Elakurichy is Agriculture. The major crops grown here are rice and sugarcane. Thanjavur and Ariyalur are the nearest cities from this village. The greenery of the paddy fields and flowing  River Kollidam are the beauty of this Village.

Villages in Ariyalur district